Otterbein University is a liberal arts college in Westerville, Ohio and is affiliated with the United Methodist Church. It has a total student enrollment of about 3,100 students. Below is a list of notable alumni:

Athletes
 Harold Anderson, NCAA basketball coach and member of the Hall of Fame
 Ernest Barnard, President of the American League from 1927–1931; owner of Cleveland Indians
 Matt D'Orazio, Pro Football quarterback; offensive player in ArenaBowl XX
 Butch Hartman, five-time USAC stock car national champion
 Drew Kasper, professional wrestler
 Jim McKee, Major League Baseball player
 Paul O'Neill, Major League Baseball player
 Steve Traylor, college baseball coach at Florida Atlantic, Duke, and Wofford

Artists 

 Evelyn Svec Ward, class of 1943, fiber artist

Composers
 Benjamin Hanby, composer of over 80 songs and hymns, including "Darling Nelly Gray" and the Christmas songs "Up on the House Top" and "Jolly Old Saint Nicholas"

Actors, entertainers
 Jonathan Bennett, television actor
 Jeremy Bobb, actor
 Mandy Bruno, soap opera actress
 Jordan Donica, stage actor
 David Graf, television actor, known for the Police Academy series
 Rachael Harris, actress and comedian
 Dee Hoty, actress
 Sam Jaeger, television actor
 Chris Jansing, television anchor and correspondent
 Gordon Jump, actor, "Big Guy" Carlson in the television series WKRP in Cincinnati
 Cabot Rea, reporter and television news anchorman; current co-anchorman of WCMH in Columbus, Ohio
 Cory Michael Smith, actor, plays Edward Nygma (aka the Riddler) in Fox's television series Gotham
 Frances Lee Strong ( Myers) or Grandma Lee, stand-up comedian
Bryan Thao Worra, writer

Politicians
 John Karefa-Smart, politician from Sierra Leone; current leader of the United National People's Party
 Lance Lord, retired Air Force Four Star General; former Commander, Air Force Space Command
 Zeola Hershey Misener, suffragist and one of the first women elected to the Indiana General Assembly
 Chalmers Wylie, Republican U.S. Congressman, 1967-1993
Kazuya Shinba, Japanese politician, secretary-general of DPFP

Religion
Judith Craig, a bishop of the United Methodist Church, recipient of Doctor of Divinity Degree

Honorary alumni
 Jack Hanna, zoologist

References

 
Otterbein University alumni